The Stone: Issue One is a limited edition live album of improvised experimental music by John Zorn, Dave Douglas, Rob Burger, Bill Laswell, Mike Patton and Ben Perowsky recorded at The Stone in 2006. The first 1000 copies were personally autographed by Zorn. All proceeds from the sale of this album support The Stone.

Reception

In a review for All About Jazz, Brian P. Lonergan wrote: "One of the more striking aspects of the playing on The Stone, Issue One... is the sense of immediacy and transparency about the music. It's as if you have a clear window into the improvisatory act, witnessing pure, unpremeditated creation as it happens for the very first time."

Track listing
 "Introduction"
 "Interlude 1" (Patton)
 "Part One"
 "Interlude 2" (Douglas/Zorn)
 "Part Two"
 "Interlude 3" (Laswell)
 "Postlude"
 "Coda"

Personnel
Dave Douglas – trumpet
Rob Burger – organ, electric piano
Bill Laswell – bass
Ben Perowsky – percussion
Mike Patton – voice
John Zorn – alto saxophone

References

Albums produced by John Zorn
John Zorn live albums
2006 live albums
Tzadik Records live albums